The Accursed Cave is an 1898 French short silent film directed by Georges Méliès.

The film was one of Méliès's early forays into themes that would later be linked to horror cinema (his The Haunted Castle, made in 1896, is sometimes labeled the first horror film). The Cave of the Demons is also believed to be the first film in which Méliès used the cinematic technique of multiple exposure.

The film was released by Méliès's Star Film Company and is numbered 164 in its catalogues. It is currently presumed lost.

See also
 List of ghost films

References

External links
 

1898 films
1898 horror films
French silent short films
French black-and-white films
Lost horror films
Films directed by Georges Méliès
French horror films
Demons in film
Lost French films
1890s lost films
1898 short films
Silent horror films
1890s French films